Henan Television, commonly abbreviated as HNTV, a provincial television broadcaster is headquartered in Zhengzhou, Henan province, China.

Foundation
HNTV was founded on September 15, 1969.

Network
Now Henan Television (HNTV) has a network of 15 channels (ten for free, five for pay-vision) broadcasting different programmes.

References

External links
 Official website

Television networks in China
Mass media in Zhengzhou
Television channels and stations established in 1969
Mass media companies established in 1969
Mass media companies of China